Roebuck Meadows is a 3.6 hectare (8.9 acre) biological Site of Special Scientific Interest south of Crowcombe in Somerset, notified in 1988.

Roebuck Meadows have a very varied and herb-rich vegetation composed of mire and grassland communities together comprising an important example of lowland mire, which is a nationally scarce habitat. The meadows contain Cornish moneywort (Sibthorpia europaea), a nationally scarce plant restricted to south-west Britain.

References 

Sites of Special Scientific Interest in Somerset
Sites of Special Scientific Interest notified in 1988
Meadows in Somerset